Taygetis drogoni is a species of butterfly of the family Nymphalidae. It is found in south-eastern Brazil in the states of Minas Gerais and São Paulo, at altitudes ranging from 800 to 1,500 meters.

The wingspan is 34.5–37 mm. Both the forewings and hindwings are brown, darker along the outer margin.

Etymology
The species name refers to Drogon, one of the three dragons of Daenerys Targaryen, a fictional character from the George R. R. Martin's novel A Song of Ice and Fire.

References

Butterflies described in 2013
Euptychiina
Fauna of Brazil
Nymphalidae of South America